A Higbee cut is a specific cut added to a screw thread to produce a blunt start, instead of the sharp end of the unmodified screw thread. It is named for its inventor Clinton Higbee. The presence of a Higbee cut on both male and female threads eliminates the chance of cross threading. A blunt start thread possessing a Higbee cut is also known as a convoluted thread.

Common Uses

Fire service
The Higbee cut is commonly used on fire hose couplings' threads. The presence of the Higbee cut and the location of the start of the thread are often marked on couplings to assist with assembly.

Thread gauges
Gauging used to inspect machine threads often includes a Higbee cut.

History
Clinton Higbee invented and patented the blunt start thread in 1891.

References 

Mechanical standards
Screws